Jordan Niebrugge (born August 4, 1993) is an American professional golfer.

Early life
Niebrugge was born just outside St. Louis in Bridgeton, Missouri. When he was at a young age, his parents, Rod and Judy Niebrugge, moved with Jordan and his older sister Alyssa to Mequon, Wisconsin.

Amateur career
Niebrugge attended Oklahoma State University–Stillwater from 2012 to 2016, where he achieved honorable mention All-American honors all four years. His senior year, he was named Big 12 men's golf Scholar-Athlete of the Year and was selected to receive first Everett Dobson Award by Oklahoma Golf Hall of Fame. 

In the summer of 2013, Niebrugge won the Wisconsin Match Play Championship, then produced an amateur winning streak that consisted of victories at the U.S. Amateur Public Links Championship, Wisconsin State Amateur, and Western Amateur. Previous victories at the Wisconsin State Open and the WIAA High School Championship places Niebrugge and PGA Tour golfer Mark Wilson as the only golfers to win all four events of the "Wisconsin Slam". 

Niebrugge was selected to play for the USA 2013 Walker Cup and 2015 Walker Cup teams where he posted wins in both singles matches. He was also chosen to represent USA in the 2013 Spirit International Amateur Golf Championship. Along with teammate Scottie Scheffler, the two combined to win the men's competition for Team USA as well as the overall combined team competition. He also tied for the overall individual lead. 

With his win at the U.S. Amateur Public Links Championship, Niebrugge received an invitation to compete at the 2014 Masters Tournament in April 2014, where he played the first two rounds at +11 and missed the cut.

In 2015, Niebrugge finished tied for medalist honors at the Hillside qualifier which resulted in an invitation to the 2015 Open Championship at St Andrews, where he went on to win the silver medal for being low amateur and tied for 6th overall. Completing the tournament at 11-under-par with an overall 277 also earned him the lowest score by an amateur in the history of The Open Championship.

Professional career
As a professional golfer, Niebrugge currently plays on Korn Ferry Tour and has competed in two major championships, The Open Championship and the U.S. Open (In 2014, he competed in the Masters Tournament as an amateur).

Amateur wins
2010 W Duncan MacMillan Classic
2013 Wisconsin Match Play Championship, U.S. Amateur Public Links, Wisconsin State Amateur, Western Amateur
2014 The Amer Ari Invitational
2015 NCAA New Haven Regional

Source:

Professional wins (2)

PGA Tour Canada wins (1)

Other wins (1)
2011 Wisconsin State Open (as an amateur)

Results in major championships 

LA = Low amateur
CUT = missed the half-way cut
"T" = tied for place

Team appearances
Amateur
Walker Cup (representing the United States): 2013 (winners), 2015
The Spirit International Amateur Golf Championship (representing the United States): 2013 (winners)

Professional
Aruba Cup (representing PGA Tour Canada): 2017 (winners)

References

External links

American male golfers
Oklahoma State Cowboys golfers
People from St. Louis County, Missouri
People from Mequon, Wisconsin
1993 births
Living people